Parinam (1961) is an Ollywood / Odia film directed by Biswanath Nayak.

Cast
 Pramod Panigrahi
 Geetisudha
 Kartik Ghosh
 Sarat Pujari

Soundtrack 
 "Chhaya Pachhe Pachhe Ghuri Bule"

References

External links
 

1961 films
1960s Odia-language films